Salvaterra de Magos is a municipality in the district of Santarém in Portugal. The population in 2011 was 22,159, in an area of 243.93 km².

The present Mayor is Hélder Manuel Ramalho de Sousa Esménio of the PS. The previous mayor Ana Cristina Pardal Ribeiro, had been the only mayor elected by the Left Bloc. The municipal holiday is Ascension Day.

It was once home to the Royal Palace of Salvaterra de Magos, a favored royal residence and hunting lodge of the Portuguese royal family. It was destroyed by fire in the early 19th century. Today, only the chapel and the falconry remain.

Notable people 
 António Roquete (1906 in Salvaterra de Magos – 1995 in Lisbon) a football goalkeeper with 16 caps for Portugal

Climate

Parishes
Administratively, the municipality is divided into 4 civil parishes (freguesias):
 Glória do Ribatejo e Granho
 Marinhais
 Muge
 Salvaterra de Magos e Foros de Salvaterra

References

External links
 Photos from Salvaterra de Magos

Towns in Portugal
Populated places in Santarém District
Municipalities of Santarém District